Alpha-1-B glycoprotein is a 54.3 kDa protein in humans that is encoded by the A1BG gene.
  The protein encoded by this gene is a plasma glycoprotein of unknown function. The protein shows sequence similarity to the variable regions of some immunoglobulin supergene family member proteins.  Patients who have pancreatic ductal adenocarcinoma show an overexpression of A1BG in pancreatic juice.

Gene

Neighborhood 

A1BG is located on the negative DNA strand of chromosome 19 from 58,858,172 – 58,864,865.  Additionally, A1BG is located directly adjacent to the ZSCAN22 gene (58,838,385-58,853,712)) on the positive DNA strand, as well as the ZNF837 (58,878,990 - 58,892,389, complement) and ZNF497 (58865723 - 58,874,214, complement) genes on the negative strand.

Expression 

A1BG is expressed at high levels in the adult and fetal liver.  Additionally, the mammary gland shows roughly half as much expression as the liver. Trace amounts of A1BG expression can be found in the blood, brain, lung, lymph node, ovary, testis, pancreas, and pancreas.  Liver tumors exhibit elevated levels of A1BG transcripts.

mRNA

mRNA structure 

The gene contains 20 distinct introns.  Transcription produces 15 different mRNAs, 10 alternatively spliced variants and 5 unspliced forms.  There are 4 probable alternative promoters, 4 non overlapping alternative last exons and 7 validated alternative polyadenylation sites.  The mRNAs appear to differ by truncation of the 5' end, truncation of the 3' end, presence or absence of 4 cassette exons, overlapping exons with different boundaries, splicing versus retention of 3 introns.

Protein

Properties 

The San Diego Super Computer's Statistical Analysis of Protein (SAPS) program determined that alpha-1B glycoprotein has 495 amino acids residues, an isoelectric point of 5.47, and a molecular mass of 54.3 kDa.  Additionally, it suggested that no transmembrane domains exist in alpha-1B glycoprotein.  According to NCBI, the amino acid sequence MLVVFLLLWGVTWGPVTEA is a signal peptide on the N-terminus of the protein that might function as an endoplasmic reticulum import signal.

Post-translational modifications 

The NetAcet 1.0 program calculated that the first five amino acid residues serve as an N-acetylation site.  The NetGlycate 1.0 program predicted that the lysines located at residue 78, 114, and 227 serve as glycation points.  The NetNES 1.1 program predicted the leucine at residue 47 to be a nuclear export signal. The NetNGlyc 1.0 program predicted four N-glycosylation sites - two of which are highly conserved internally repeated sequences.   The NetCGlyc1.0 program predicted that none of the tryptophan residues serve as C-mannosylation sites.

Protein interactions 

A study by Udby et al. showed that Cysteine-rich secretory protein 3 is a ligand of alpha-1B glycoprotein in human plasma and they suggest that the A1BG-CRISP-3 complex displays a similar function in protecting the circulation from a potentially harmful effect of free CRISP-3.

Sex-specific role in cardiac function 
Female mice with cardiac conditional knockout of A1BG exhibit poor cardiac function, but male mice with the same knockout are unaffected.

Homology

Orthologs 

In addition to the table below, alpha-1B glycoprotein is also conserved in the white-cheeked crested gibbon, baboon, bolivian squirrel monkey, sheep, dog, wild boar, Chinese tree shrew, Chinese hamster, black flying fox, rabbit, guinea pig, giant panda, cow, rat, and the naked mole-rat.  Additionally, it is very likely that A1BG is further conserved throughout the mammalian clade.

Paralogs 

No paralogs have been found for alpha-1B glycoprotein.

Homologous domains 

An initial NCBI Blast alignment of alpha-1B glycoprotein illustrates that the protein is mainly composed of three immunoglobulin domains.  There is a large segment of amino acids from position 297 to 400 that is not shown to be an immunoglobulin domain.  However, a NCBI BLAST alignment of just the amino acids from 297 to 400 does illustrate that the latter sequence is indeed a fourth immunoglobulin domain.   Ultimately, alpha-1B glycoprotein seems to be primarily composed of four immunoglobulin domains.

Clinical significance

Steroid-resistant nephrotic syndrome 

The alpha-1-glycoprotein is upregulated 11-fold in the urine of patients who have steroid resistant nephrotic syndrome.  A1BG was present in 7/19 patients with SRNS and was absent from all patients with steroid sensitive nephrotic syndrome.  The 13.8 kDa A1BG fragment had a high discriminatory power for steroid resistance in pediatric nephrotic syndrome, but is only present in a subset of patients.

References

External links